Ken Harrison (20 January 1926 – November 2010) was an English professional footballer who played as a right winger.

Career
Born in Stockton-on-Tees, Harrison played for Billingham Synthonia, Hull City, Derby County and Goole Town.

He died in November 2010.

References

1926 births
2010 deaths
English footballers
Billingham Synthonia F.C. players
Hull City A.F.C. players
Derby County F.C. players
Goole Town F.C. players
English Football League players
Association football wingers